Jacksonville is a city in Morgan County, Illinois, United States. The population was 19,446 at the 2010 census. It is the county seat of Morgan County. It is home to Illinois College, Illinois School for the Deaf, and the Illinois School for the Visually Impaired. Jacksonville is the principal city of the Jacksonville Micropolitan Statistical Area, which includes all of Morgan and Scott counties.

History
Jacksonville was established by European Americans on a 160-acre tract of land in the center of Morgan County in 1825, two years after the county was founded.  The founders of Jacksonville, Illinois were settlers from New England. These people were "Yankee" settlers, that is to say they were descended from the English Puritans who settled New England in the 1600s.  They were part of a wave of New England farmers who headed west into what was then the wilds of the Northwest Territory during the early 1800s.  Most of them arrived as a result of the completion of the Erie Canal and the end of the Black Hawk War.  The Yankee migration to Illinois was a result of several factors, one of which was the overpopulation of New England. The old stock Yankee population had large families, often bearing up to ten children in one household. Most people were expected to have their own piece of land to farm, and due to the massive and nonstop population boom, land in New England became scarce as every son claimed his own farmstead. As a result, there was not enough land for every family to have a self-sustaining farm, and Yankee settlers began leaving New England for the Midwestern United States.  When they arrived in what is now Jacksonville there was nothing but dense virgin forest and wild prairie, the "Yankee" New Englanders laid out farms, constructed roads, erected government buildings and established post routes.  They brought with them many of their Yankee New England values, such as a passion for education, establishing many schools as well as staunch support for abolitionism.  They were mostly members of the Congregationalist Church though some were Episcopalian.  Due to the second Great Awakening some of them had converted to Methodism and Presbyterianism while some others became Baptist, before moving to what is now Jacksonville.  Jacksonville, like some other parts of Illinois, would be culturally very continuous with early New England culture for most of its early history.

The town was laid out on a treeless prairie and along a state road that ran from Springfield to the Illinois River.

The town grew at a rapid rate, and a town square was quickly developed. In 1829, the Presbyterian Reverend John M. Ellis worked to found a new "seminary of learning" in the new state of Illinois. A group of Congregational students at Yale College heard about his plans and headed westward to establish the new school. These students were a part of the famous "Yale Bands," groups of students who established several colleges in the frontier, what is now the Midwest. Illinois College was one of the first institutions of higher learning in the Midwest.  A new courthouse was built on the square, churches were constructed, railroads were planned, and stores and taverns were built.  By 1834, Jacksonville had the largest population of any city in the state of Illinois, vastly outnumbering Chicago (only founded the year before). In the 1830s, the town was on the path of Native Americans who were being forcibly removed by the federal government to west of the Mississippi. The Potawatomi passed through here in 1838 on what they called their Trail of Death as they were forced from their traditional homelands to the dry and barren Indian Territory to the west.

Jacksonville's education complex and standing in the state was developed by the establishment of state institutions: the Illinois School for the Deaf and what is now called Illinois School for the Visually Impaired. The Illinois Conference Female Academy was founded for education for girls; it later developed as MacMurray College.  By 1850, Illinois College had issued Illinois' first college degrees and opened the first medical school in the state.  Because of this, Jacksonville earned the nickname of "Athens of the West."

In 1851, Illinois opened its first state mental hospital in Jacksonville; it became a major employer for the area.

The attorney Abraham Lincoln occasionally had legal business in Jacksonville, frequently acting either as co-counsel or opposing counsel with David A. Smith, a Jacksonville resident. In what is now Central Park, Lincoln delivered a strong antislavery speech on September 6, 1856, in support of the presidential campaign of John C. Frémont, lasting over two hours.  A mural depicting the event has been painted on the side of a building at the southwest corner of the square. During the antebellum years, Jacksonville was a stopping point on the historic Underground Railroad, as refugee slaves moved north to freedom, many going into Canada.

1900 to present

Between 1892 and 1910, Jacksonville was home to minor league baseball, as the Jacksonville Jacks and Jacksonville Lunatics played in eight different minor leagues. Jacksonville teams played at League Park on Finley Street.

In 1911 as part of the progressive movement, Jacksonville adopted the city commission form of government, the first mayor being George W. Davis.

In the summer of 1965, in order to keep up with customer demand for records by the Beatles, the wildly popular English band, Capitol Records opened a vinyl record pressing plant on the western outskirts of Jacksonville, at 1 Capitol Way. The plant produced a number of highly collectible pressings. This plant eventually served the Capitol Records Club, producing vinyl LPs and later audiocassettes, CDs, and DVDs of a number of artists.

At its peak, operating as EMI Records (owner of Capitol), the plant employed over 1,000 workers. It was a significant location in the music industry.  For example, all seven albums released by country western artist Garth Brooks sold more than 50 million copies. EMI held a "thank-you" luncheon for 1,000 workers at the Jacksonville plant on March 10, 1995. A decade later, EMI ceased manufacturing operations at Jacksonville in 2004.

Geography
Jacksonville is located at  (39.731936, −90.234394).

The city sits in the middle of mostly flat, fertile farmland. One branch of Mauvaisterre Creek empties into Lake Mauvaisterre, a small reservoir surrounded on three sides by parkland.  Just to the south of the city lies Lake Jacksonville, a 476-acre lake with 18.6 miles of shoreline. Lake Jacksonville was named the Number One Fishing Spot in Illinois by Field and Stream Magazine.

Climate

Demographics

As of the census of 2010, there were 19,446 people, 7,357 households, and 4,174 families residing in the city. The racial makeup of the city was 85.3% White, 10.2% African American, 0.3% Native American, 0.7% Asian, 1.1% from other races, and 2.4% from two or more races. Hispanic or Latino of any race were 3% of the population.

There were 7,357 households, out of which 24.3% had children under the age of 18 living with them, 38.8% were married couples living together, 13.7% had a female householder with no husband present, and 43.3% were non-families. 36.3% of all households were made up of individuals, and 13.9% had someone living alone who was 65 years of age or older. The average household size was 2.23 and the average family size was 2.88.

In the city, the population was spread out, with 22.0% under the age of 18, 14.2% from 18 to 24, 25.1% from 25 to 44, 21.9% from 45 to 64, and 16.9% who were 65 years of age or older. The median age was 37 years. For every 100 females, there were 91.0 males. For every 100 females age 18 and over, there were 87.4 males.

The median income for a household in the city was $40,670, and the median income for a family was $56,343. Males had a median income of $42,409 versus $30,208 for females. The per capita income for the city was $21,245. About 11.9% of families and 18% of the population were below the poverty line, including 24.9% of those under age 18 and 11.8% of those age 65 or over.

Business

Jacksonville is the home of the Eli Bridge Company, manufacturer of Ferris wheels and other amusement rides such as the Scrambler. W.E. Sullivan founded the firm with the introduction of his first portable "Big Eli" Wheel on the Jacksonville Square on May 23, 1900. Jacksonville was once home to the J. Capps & Son Company, one of the largest manufacturers of textiles and clothing in the United States, and owned by the Capps family, which was intermarried with the family of Jacob Bunn and John Whitfield Bunn of Springfield, Illinois, and Chicago.

Reynolds Group Holdings (formerly Mobil Plastics, Tenneco, Pactiv) and Nestlé Beverage Co. have facilities in Jacksonville.

Education

Jacksonville is home to one private four-year college, Illinois College. Illinois College is the second oldest college in Illinois, founded in 1829 (and the first to grant a degree – 1835) by one of the famous Yale Bands—students from Yale College who traveled westward to found new colleges. It briefly served as the state's first medical school from 1843 to 1848, and became co-educational in 1903. Beecher Hall, the first college building erected in Illinois, is named after its first president,Edward Beecher, brother to Henry Ward Beecher and Harriet Beecher Stowe. Jacksonville was also the home of the now-closed private four-year college, MacMurray College from 1846 to 2020.

Jacksonville is also home to three state-run institutions, including the Illinois School for the Deaf, the Illinois School for the Visually Impaired, and the Jacksonville Correctional Center.  Lincoln Land Community College's Western Region Education Center is also located in Jacksonville.

Jacksonville is home to three high schools, two private, and one public, including Routt Catholic High School. Jacksonville School District 117 provides education for the city and much of the county with six elementary schools, one junior high school, and one senior high school.

Media
The city's daily newspaper, the Jacksonville Journal-Courier, is the oldest continuously published newspaper in Illinois (since 1830).

The city also has a weekly newspaper, The Source.

Several radio stations operate out of Jacksonville- WCIC 90.7-FM, WLDS 1180-AM, WEAI 107.1-FM, WJVO 105.5-FM, and WJIL, which simulcasts on 102.9-FM and 1550-AM.

NOAA Weather Radio station WXM90 transmits from Lynnville and is licensed to NOAA's Central Illinois National Weather Service Forecast Office at Lincoln and St. Louis, broadcasting on a frequency of 162.525 mHz (channel 6 on most newer weather radios, and most SAME weather radios). The station activates the SAME tone alarm feature and a 1050 Hz tone activating older radios (except for AMBER Alerts, using the SAME feature only) for hazardous weather and non-weather warnings and emergencies, along with selected weather watches, for the Illinois counties of Brown, Calhoun, Cass, Greene, Morgan, Pike, and Scott. Weather permitting, a tone alarm test of both the SAME and 1050 Hz tone features are conducted every Wednesday between 11 am and Noon.

Infrastructure

Health care
Jacksonville Memorial Hospital, formerly known as Passavant Area Hospital, is the prime source of medical treatment in the area.

The Jacksonville Developmental Center, a state facility, operated here from 1851 to November 2012.

Notable people

Culture

In 2005, Sufjan Stevens released Illinois, a concept album making reference to various people and places associated with the state. Its fifth track, "Jacksonville," refers to various landmarks in the town, such as Nichols Park. It also contains a story about A. W. Jackson, a "colored preacher" urban legend supposes the town is named after, as well as President Andrew Jackson (President from 1829 to 1837) after whom the town's officials say it is actually named.

The Grammy-winning album Stones in the Road by singer-songwriter Mary Chapin Carpenter features the song "John Doe #24" that describes a series of events that occurred in Jacksonville relating to the person on whose life the song is based. The song tells the story of a blind and deaf man who was found wandering the streets in Jacksonville in 1945. The man was hospitalized for diabetes and kept in various institutions until he died nearly 50 years later in 1993. During his 48 years of institutionalization, nobody ever found out his name, nor did anyone who knew or was related to him come to Jacksonville to establish his identity. It was speculated that he was originally from New Orleans, but this was never verified. Likewise, how he came to Jacksonville remains a mystery to this day.

Cultural offerings include the Jacksonville Symphony Orchestra, the Jacksonville Theatre Guild, the Art Association of Jacksonville and its David Strawn Art Gallery, as well as many public events and activities hosted by MacMurray College and Illinois College. Recent additions to the cultural scene include the Imagine Foundation and the Eclectic art gallery, both located in the city's downtown.  The Jacksonville Area Museum, located just outside the downtown area, is home to many historical artifacts and is the repository of the MacMurray College Archive collection.

Jacksonville also holds the unusual distinction of having a large number of pipe organs for a city of its size – eleven in all – found at various local churches, as well as both of its four-year colleges.

A notable Portuguese American community has existed on the outskirts of Jacksonville since the nineteenth century. The origins of this community can be traced to 1838, when a Scottish reverend named Robert Reid Kalley visited the Portuguese island of Madeira and converted a number of the locals to Protestantism. These Madeiran Protestants faced discrimination and alienation due to being Protestant in a largely Catholic community, causing the converts to relocate from Madeira to the Caribbean island of Trinidad before coming to the United States in 1849 and settling near Jacksonville.

Attractions

Jacksonville Speedway is a racetrack on the Morgan County Fairgrounds. It has a grandstand that can seat 2,000 people.

Nichols Park is a park on the south side of Jacksonville. It has a playground, golf course, lake, and community pool.

References

Further reading 
 Don H. Doyle, The Social Order of a Frontier Community: Jacksonville, Illinois, 1825–70, 1978
 Vernon R.Q. Fernandes, The People of Jacksonville—A Pictorial History, 1991
 Vernon R.Q. Fernandes, Faces & places—a Morgan County family album, 1995
 Vernon R.Q. Fernandes, Passavant Area Hospital : 125 years of caring, 1999

External links

Official Jacksonville, Illinois web site
City-Data.com

Cities in Illinois
Jacksonville, Illinois micropolitan area
Cities in Morgan County, Illinois
Populated places on the Underground Railroad
County seats in Illinois
Populated places established in 1825
Jacksonville, Illinois